Račji Dvor Mansion (literally "Ducks' Court Mansion") is a 17th-century mansion standing on a plain at the western edge of the town of Maribor, Slovenia, at the address of Raški dol 1. It has been protected as a cultural monument of national significance.

Architecture
The mansion complex consists of four two-story non-connected buildings enclosing a central courtyard. The pediment of the facade of the main building bears the arms of the Admonts and the date "1778." The facades of the lesser buildings are more modest. The inner courtyard was once faced with arched arcades, since walled over.

History
The mansion was first mentioned in 1284. It was rebuilt in 1414–16, and extensively altered during the 17th and 18th centuries. The east building is the oldest, dating from the 17th century. The 1733–34 rebuilding saw the southern (now main) wing enlarged. Between 1776 and 1778 the western (housekeeping) wing was added, the facades altered to their current form and the inner arcades filled in. The Northern wing was added in 1864.

Open-air museum
An open-air museum lies on a plain directly adjacent to the mansion and below a series of hills covered with abandoned vineyards. The museum's central building is surrounded by examples of typical architecture from the neighboring areas of Drava Plain, Haloze, Slovene Hills, Pohorje and Kozjak. The complex is surrounded by heirloom orchards, gardens, pastures and fields.

References

External links
Račji Dvor Mansion (topographic plans)

Mansions in Slovenia
Museums in Slovenia
Buildings and structures in Maribor
Open-air museums
Tourist attractions in Maribor
Cultural monuments of Slovenia
Outdoor structures in Slovenia